Kharat is a village in Badakhshan Province in north-eastern Afghanistan. It is located about 28 miles southeast of Kala Panja.

References

Populated places in Wakhan District
Wakhan